Gina Messina (born 1975), previously known as Gina Messina-Dysert, is an American religious studies and women's studies scholar and activist.  She gives particular attention to gender issues in religion.

Messina is co-founder of Feminism and Religion, which she founded in 2011 with Caroline Kline, Xochitl Alvizo, and Cynthia Garrity Bond. Feminism and Religion is a project that explores the intersection between scholarship and the feminism (the "F-word") in religion, community, and activism.

Messina is also founder and Editor in Chief of The Far Press, an independent feminist publisher which publishes books that explore feminism and gender, religion and spirituality, politics, and social change.

She is the Assistant Professor of Religious Studies at Ursuline College in Pepper Pike, Ohio, where she formerly served as Dean of the School of Graduate and Professional Studies.  Prior to her time at Ursuline College, Messina served as the Director of the Center for Women's Interdisciplinary Research and Education (WIRE) at Claremont Graduate University and as a Visiting Professor of Theological Ethics at Loyola Marymount University.

Biography 
Born September 6, 1975, Messina grew up in Shaker Heights, Ohio, where she moved after her parents' divorce when she was 12. She earned her GED "while working double shifts at the local Dairy Queen".

Messina earned her doctorate at Claremont Graduate University, focussing on women studies in religion, theology, ethics, and culture.  Her advisor was Rosemary Radford Ruether. She completed a Master of Arts degree in religious studies at John Carroll University.  She also earned a Master of Business Administration degree with a dual focus in organizational leadership and marketing at the University of Findlay and completed her undergraduate degree at Cleveland State University.

Publications

Messina has authored articles in a variety of publications and regularly writes for The Huffington Post. She is the author of Rape Culture and Spiritual Violence (Routledge, 2014), and If Jesus Ran for President (The Far Press, 2016). She is also co-editor of Faithfully Feminist: Jewish, Christian, and Muslim Feminists on Why We Stay (with Jennifer Zobair and Amy Levin, White Cloud Press, 2015) and Feminism and Religion in the 21st Century (with Rosemary Radford Ruether, Routledge, 2014).

Messina is a regular speaker around the US at universities, organizations, conferences, and in the national news circuit.  She has appeared on Tavis Smiley, MSNBC, and NPR and gave the TEDx Talk "The New Feminist Revolution in Religion". She has also spoken at the Commission on the Status of Women at the United Nations.

References

External links
 

1975 births
21st-century American women writers
21st-century Roman Catholics
Activists from California
American feminist writers
American religion academics
American Roman Catholic religious writers
American women non-fiction writers
Catholic feminists
Claremont Graduate University alumni
Claremont Graduate University faculty
Cleveland State University alumni
Feminist studies scholars
John Carroll University alumni
Living people
Place of birth missing (living people)
Roman Catholic scholars
University of Findlay alumni
Writers from Shaker Heights, Ohio
American women academics
Catholic feminism